Alligator is the third studio album by American indie rock band The National, released on April 12, 2005 on Beggars Banquet. Recorded and produced by Peter Katis and Paul Mahajan, the album brought The National critical acclaim and increased their fanbase significantly.

Alligator appeared on many year-end top 10 lists, including Uncut and Planet Sound, both of which ranked it as the number two album of 2005. Pitchfork ranked Alligator at number 40 in their top albums of the 2000s list. Alligator has sold over 200,000 copies worldwide.

The band performed album track "The Geese of Beverly Road" at the wedding of producer Peter Katis. A photo of the band performing on stage, with couples dancing in the foreground, became the cover of the band's next album Boxer.

The band supported Barack Obama's presidential candidacy in 2008. In July of that year, the band designed and sold a T-shirt featuring Obama's image above the words "Mr. November", a reference to both the closing track on the album and the month of the U.S. presidential election. All proceeds were donated to Obama's campaign. The song had been written, in part, about John Kerry's candidacy four years earlier.

Track listing

Singles
 "Abel" (March 14, 2005)
 CD single b/w: "Driver, Surprise Me" and "Keep It Upstairs"
 7" single b/w: "Warm Singing Whores"
 Digital download b/w: "The Thrilling of Claire"
 "Secret Meeting" (August 29, 2005)
 Digital download: "Secret Meeting" (Remix) b/w: "The Geese of Beverly Road" (Live)
 "Lit Up" (November 14, 2005)
 CD single: "Lit Up" (Remix) b/w: "You've Done It Again, Virginia"
 Digital download: "Lit Up" (Remix) b/w: "You've Done It Again, Virginia" and "Lit Up" (Parisian Party Version)

Personnel
The National
Matt Berninger - lead vocals
Aaron Dessner - lead and rhythm guitars, backing vocals, keyboards, piano, bass
Bryce Dessner - rhythm and lead guitars
Scott Devendorf - bass, backing vocals, rhythm guitar
Bryan Devendorf - drums, percussion

Additional musicians
 An-Lin Bardin – cello
 Carin Besser – backing vocals
 Nathalie Dessner – backing vocals
 Rachael Elliott – bassoon
 Peter Katis – backing vocals
 Nick Lloyd – piano, organ, keyboards
 Nate Martinez – additional guitar
 Padma Newsome – viola, violin, piano, organ, orchestration
 Sara Phillips – clarinet

Recording personnel
 Paul Mahajan – recording
 Peter Katis – additional recording and production, mixing
 Greg Calbi – mastering

Artwork
 Mathieu Saura – photography
 Distant Station Ltd. – design

Certifications

References

2005 albums
The National (band) albums
Beggars Banquet Records albums
Albums produced by Peter Katis